Turgut Polat (born 9 September 1993, in Kars) is a male Turkish table tennis player.

Major achievements 
Two-time Turkish Champion runner-up in cadet level
Five-time Turkish Champion runner-up in junior level
Six-time Turkish Super League Champion runner-up
Three-time University Champion runner-up

References

External links 
 Player profile on fenerbahce.org
 Team page on fenerbahce.org

1993 births
Living people
Turkish male table tennis players
Fenerbahçe table tennis players
21st-century Turkish people